Maria "Mariuccia" Dominiani (born 10 May 1913) was an Italian actress.

Biography
Dominiani made her debut on screen in the 1936 film Joe the Red, dedicating herself also to variety shows and photo comics in the following decade. In 1944, she was arrested and imprisoned, after being accused of having collaborated with the Nazis during the fascist regime, but was released from prison because there was no evidence against her. In the 1950s, Dominiani dealt with organizing stage shows, and also played in minor roles in some films until 1961.

Partial filmography

 Joe the Red (1936)
 I've Lost My Husband! (1937)
 Lasciate ogni speranza (1937)
 We Were Seven Widows (1939)
 Inspector Vargas (1940)
 Caravaggio, il pittore maledetto (1941)
 A Woman Has Fallen (1941)
 Without a Woman (1943)
 Eleven Men and a Ball (1948)
 The Ship of Condemned Women (1953)
 Day by Day, Desperately (1961)

References

External links
 

1913 births
Possibly living people
Actors from Genoa
Italian film actresses
Italian stage actresses
Italian radio personalities
Italian television actresses
20th-century Italian actresses